Hogansville is a city in Troup County, Georgia, United States. The population was 3,060 at the 2010 census. Since 1998, Hogansville has held an annual Hummingbird Festival in October. It is located approximately halfway between Atlanta and Columbus, Georgia on Interstate 85 via Interstate 185.

History
The community was named after William Hogan, owner of the original town site.

Attractions and events
 Hogansville Hummingbird Festival, outdoor arts-and-crafts festival held the third weekend of October
Christmas Parade, "Santa Claus and dozens of floats, both home-made and professional, our parade is small town life at its best"
Trunk or Treat, "A great Hogansville Halloween idea. Fun for kids of all ages. Proves the adage that it's better to give than receive."
Van Byars Antique Auction, a Hogansville tradition, every third Saturday throughout the year

Geography

Hogansville is located at  (33.170022, -84.909146). Hogansville is located along Interstate 85, which runs northeast to southwest through the city, leading northeast  to Atlanta and southwest  to Montgomery, Alabama. Other highways which run through the city include U.S. Route 29, Georgia State Route 54, and Georgia State Route 100.

Demographics

2020 census

As of the 2020 United States census, there were 3,267 people, 1,056 households, and 657 families residing in the city.

2000 census
As of the census of 2000, there were 2,774 people, 1,099 households, and 727 families residing in the city. The racial makeup of the city was 55.16% White, 43.22% African American, 0.18% Native American, 0.47% Asian, 0.29% from other races, and 0.68% from two or more races. Hispanic or Latino of any race were 0.58% of the population.

There were 1,099 households, out of which 29.7% had children under the age of 18 living with them, 39.2% were married couples living together, 22.6% had a female householder with no husband present, and 33.8% were non-families. 31.4% of all households were made up of individuals, and 16.7% had someone living alone who was 65 years of age or older.  The average household size was 2.49 and the average family size was 3.11.

In the city, the population was spread out, with 27.9% under the age of 18, 8.4% from 18 to 24, 25.3% from 25 to 44, 22.1% from 45 to 64, and 16.3% who were 65 years of age or older.  The median age was 37 years. For every 100 females, there were 82.0 males.  For every 100 females age 18 and over, there were 77.7 males.

The median income for a household in the city was $27,976, and the median income for a family was $32,979. Males had a median income of $27,028 versus $18,889 for females. The per capita income for the city was $12,592.  About 10.2% of families and 12.6% of the population were below the poverty line, including 16.4% of those under age 18 and 13.9% of those age 65 or over.

Gallery

Notable people
J. M. Gates, preacher and gospel singer.
Terry Godwin, football player UGA.
Gar Heard, basketball player.
Alfred Jenkins, football player.
Luther "Houserocker" Johnson, blues guitarist and singer.
Ed Levy, baseball player.
Cowboy Jimmy Moore, billiard champion.
Derek Smith, basketball player.
John Whelchel, football player.

References

External links
 Official City of Hogansville Site
 Hogansville Hummingbird Festival
 Hogansville GA Welcome Center, operated by the Merchant's Association

Cities in Georgia (U.S. state)
Cities in Troup County, Georgia